Brink of Disaster! is a 1972 American film directed by John Florea.

Plot
A student is held up in the library while a riot rages outside. As SDS protesters head to burn the library down, he has to fend them off with his baseball bat. This film opens with actual footage of civil disturbances in the 1960s, and moves on to images of historical American figures.

Cast
Ed Nelson
Gary Crabbe

See also
 List of American films of 1972

References

External links

1972 films
Hippie films
American political drama films
American social guidance and drug education films
Films about educators
American coming-of-age drama films
1970s English-language films
1972 drama films
Films directed by John Florea
1970s American films